Thomas Vaughan may refer to:

Thomas Vaughan (footballer) (born 1864), Welsh international footballer
Thomas Vaughan (MP) (bef. 1479–1543), Member of Parliament for Dover
Thomas Vaughan (philosopher) (1621–1666), Welsh philosopher
Thomas Vaughan (pirate) (died 1696), Irish pirate and privateer who served France
Thomas Vaughan (singer) (1782–1843), English singer
Thomas Vaughan (died 1483) (c. 1410–1483), Welsh soldier, diplomat, and chamberlain to the eldest son of King Edward IV

See also
Tom Vaughan (disambiguation)
Tom Vaughn (disambiguation)
Thomas Franklin Vaughns (Born 1920), Tuskegee Airman